Ruten is a mountain in Trøndelag county, Norway. This is the highest point in the municipality of Heim.

References

Mountains of Trøndelag
One-thousanders of Norway
Heim, Norway
Rindal